The Ayrshire Coast Line is one of the lines within the Strathclyde suburban rail network in Scotland. It has 26 stations and connects the Ayrshire coast to Glasgow.

The route is operated by ScotRail.

History

The Ayrshire Coast Line consists of lines that were formerly part of the Glasgow and Paisley Joint Railway, the Glasgow, Paisley, Kilmarnock and Ayr Railway, the Ardrossan Railway and its Largs Branch extension.

After electrification

The line to Ayr was electrified and Class 318 electric multiple units introduced by British Rail in September 1986. The full electrified service, including trains to Largs and Ardrossan Harbour, commenced on 19 January 1987. These were supplemented by occasional use of Class 303 and Class 311 EMUs, then in use on the Inverclyde Line. 

These EMUs replaced the Class 101 and Class 107 DMUs that had served the line for over 30 years. Class 126 DMUs were also used on the line, but they succumbed to old age in the early 1980s.

Services
For most of the day, 6 trains per hour run between Glasgow Central and Kilwinning, 4 go to Ayr whilst 2 service Largs and Ardrossan Harbour branches. Glasgow to Ayr trains which leave Glasgow at xx00 and xx30 between 0830 and 1830 and from Ayr leaving at xx23 and xx50 between 0850 and 1623 will run non stop between Kilwinning and Glasgow Central. After 1900, the service reduces to 4 trains per hour. All trains call at Paisley and Kilwinning with 2 trains going to Ayr while the other 2 serve Ardrossan and Largs. On a Sunday, a reduced service operates, 3 trains per hour run with 2 going to Ayr and 1 going to Largs. 5 trains daily run to Ardrossan Harbour to meet the ferry to Brodick. On Sunday evening, it reduces to only 2 trains per hour with 1 to Ayr and Largs. Troon, Prestwick and Ayr are also served by the Glasgow South Western Line with trains running between Glasgow- Girvan/Stranraer and Kilmarnock-Girvan/Stranraer.

As of August 2020, all services are run by Class 380s. Until they were withdrawn, Class 314s were used on some peak time services when the 380s were in short supply.
In the August 2020 timetable, Largs and Ardrossan Harbour both run an hourly service and there are roughly 3 trains per hour to Ayr, however the frequency changes several times during the day.
There were 5 trains per day between Ayr and Edinburgh until March 2020, these services were already planned to be axed in May 2020 and are not present in the August 2020 timetable.

Route

Here the line branches in two, with one branch running south along the coast to Troon and Ayr. This branch also serves Prestwick Airport station, which opened in 1994. The other branch runs north along the coast to Ardrossan or Largs, becoming a single track for passenger trains after Saltcoats. Beyond Ayr, 'Sprinter' DMUs continue south towards Girvan and Stranraer.

The line connects with ferries at Ardrossan to Brodick on the Isle of Arran and at Largs to Great Cumbrae.

References

Notes

Sources

Further reading

Transport in North Ayrshire
Transport in East Ayrshire
Transport in South Ayrshire
Railway lines in Scotland
Standard gauge railways in Scotland